Vallenbrosa is an English metal band from Petersfield, Hampshire, England, formed in late 2002. Their members include Nik Taylor-Stoakes (vocals), Simon McCarthy (lead guitar), Steve Stidolph (rhythm guitar), Russ Smith (Bass) and Dave Baker (Drums). As of 2006, they had released 3 albums, both were self-released, called Silenced and Hessian Mercenaries And “in the face of adversity” Singles from these albums include "Still Breathing" and "The Hessian".

Influences
Vallenbrosa cite their influences from bands such as Pantera, Alice in Chains, Down, Faith No More and others. For instance, there is a distinct similarity to early Corrosion of Conformity, particularly elements of the lead guitar work of both Simon McCarthy and Steven Stidolph on single "The Hessian". The over-all sound has been described as "southern - style sludge".

Career
In 2007, Vallenbrosa supported Sepultura's Dante XI World Tour. Following this, their self-released album Hessian Mercenaries was well received by fans and by Metal Hammer who noted that "Vallenbrosa are capable of expressing rage without resorting to stereotypical sonic violence". In September they were on the bill for butserfest. They played alongside Elliot Minor and Furthest Drive Home. In 2008, they garnered interest from Dave Mustaine of Megadeth, despite losing the supporting slot of Megadeth's 2008 European Tour of Duty to British thrash metallers Evile. Since then Vallenbrosa are under America's New World Artist Management, but currently remain unsigned.

They recorded their new album as of 2008 with Pete Miles in Devon, which was in August 2008 in Nashville, US, by Rob Coates and Vlado Meller, with a follow up gig at Nottingham Rock City on 30 August. They will also be performing with Malefice on 19 July at the Gedfest Festival Hall in Petersfield "Rock City". They are also on the bill for Butserfest on 12 September having also played the previous year. They played the unsigned stage at Bloodstock, England's biggest metal festival on 14 August 2009.

Discography
Hessian Mercenaries CD (2007, Self-released)
In the Face of Adversity CD (2009, Self-released)

References

External links
 Vallenbrosa Official Site
 Vallenbrosa MySpace

English heavy metal musical groups